Ti Rocher is a town in the Micoud District of the island nation of Saint Lucia.  It is also a 2nd level division in Micoud District.

Geography 
The village is located on the heights above the town of Micoud and south of the Troumassee River. The next villages are Moreau (N), Anbre (O), Fond D’Or (S), La Courville (SW), Des Blanchard (SW),  und Paix Bouche (W) and Tou Cochan/Ti Rocher (NW).

See also
List of cities in Saint Lucia
Micoud District
Geography of Saint Lucia
Ti Rocher, Castries

References

Towns in Saint Lucia